Contomastix is a genus of lizards in the family Teiidae. The genus is endemic to South America.

Species
The genus Contomastix contains the following six species which are recognized as being valid, listed alphabetically.
Contomastix celata 
Contomastix lacertoides  – Bibron's whiptail
Contomastix leachei 
Contomastix serrana 
Contomastix vacariensis 
Contomastix vittata 

Nota bene: A binomial authority in parentheses indicates that the species was originally described in a genus other than Contomastix.

References

Further reading
Harvey, Michael B.; Ugueto, Gilson N.; Gutberlet, Ronald L. (2012). "Review of Teiid Morphology with a Revised Taxonomy and Phylogeny of the Teiidae (Lepidosauria: Squamata)". Zootaxa 3459: 1–156. (Contomasix, new genus, p. 112).

 
Lizard genera
Taxa named by Michael B. Harvey
Taxa named by Gabriel N. Ugueto
Taxa named by Ronald L. Gutberlet Jr.